Yong Yu Sing No. 18 was a Taiwanese fishing vessel found adrift and unoccupied near Midway Island after losing contact with shore. Taiwanese authorities concluded the crew was lost due to a weather event.

Vessel
The Yong Yu Sing No. 18 is a fishing vessel used for longline tuna fishing. Its IMO number is 8546579.

Discovery
The vessel was spotted floating near Midway Island on January 2, 2021. Upon further inspection by the United States Coast Guard, a lifeboat was missing, as were all ten crew. The ship was also damaged in what looked to be a collision. The boat was left adrift in the Pacific Ocean, and the U.S. Coast Guard continued to search for the missing crew. Of the ten on board when it went missing, nine were of Indonesian nationality, and the captain was Taiwanese.

Investigation

The incident was investigated by Taiwan Yilan District Prosecutors Office. They found there were "no signs of physical altercations, blood, or explosions" but there were "multiple structural damages found on the hull .. indicat[ing] the boat underwent strong wind waves from multiple directions". The case was closed with the conclusion of "no criminal conducts involved". Liberty Times reported that the most likely cause was that large waves have caused the crew to fall into the sea, and that murder or piracy is not likely.

References

Maritime incidents in 2021
2001 ships
Ghost ships
Ships of Taiwan